Everett W. Reimer (1910–1998) was an education theorist who authored several books on educational policy and was a proponent of deschooling. He was a notable friend of Ivan Illich, whom he met at the Catholic University of Puerto Rico.

Everett did a variety of things before joining CIDOC, including selling maps, playing professional football, printing greeting cards, and working at a tire factory. During the Second World War he was a civil servant. After the war Reimer worked for the Atomic Energy Commission, for the Survey Research Center at the University of Michigan, and for the Washington Research Center of the Maxwell School, University of Syracuse.

After these jobs Reimer came to Puerto Rico as Secretary of Committee of Human Resources, and worked for the Alliance for Progress. Reimer met Ivan Illich in 1958 in Puerto Rico, where they jointly developed their philosophy of deschooling. Reimer then joined the Center for Intercultural Documentation (CIDOC), as the Director of the CIDOC seminar on Alternatives in Education.

Books published 

 Power for All or for None by Katherine and Everett Reimer (1998)
 Paperback: 348 pages
 Publisher: Inkworks Press Oakland, CA (1998)
 Language: English
 
 School is Dead: Alternatives in Education
 176 pages
 Publisher: Penguin (1971)
 Language: English
 
 Unusual ideas in education (Series B: Opinions / International Commission on the Development of Education) (Series B: Opinions / International Commission on the Development of Education)
 11 pages 
 Publisher: Unesco (January 1, 1971)
 Language: English
 
 Social problems associated with the development of Puerto Rico during the last two decades (January 1, 1960)
 Publisher: s.n. (January 1, 1960) 
 Language: English
 
 Venezuela's human resources (January 1, 1964)
 Problems of methodology in the investigation and planning of education [and] training in Venezuela (January 1, 1964)
 Three weeks in the life of a utopia (1976)
 Futuros alternativos (Serie de planificación)
 110 pages
 Publisher: Editorial Universitaria, Universidad de Puerto Rico; 1. ed edition (1976)
 Language: Spanish
 
 Social planning: Collected papers, 1957-68 (CIDOC cuaderno) (1968)
 Comprehensive educational planning in Puerto Rico (Comprehensive planning in state education agencies) (January 1, 1968)
 103 pages
 Publisher: Office of Planning and Educational Development, Dept. of Education (January 1, 1968)
 Language: English

References

External links
Whalesong.org review
Amazon reviews of "School is Dead"
Critical studies of schooling review

1910 births
1998 deaths
Advocates of unschooling and homeschooling